Cima da Lägh (also known as Cima di Lago) is a mountain in the Oberhalbstein Range of the Alps, located on the border between Italy and Switzerland. On its southern side it overlooks the Val Bregaglia.

References

External links
 Cima da Lägh on Hikr

Mountains of the Alps
Alpine three-thousanders
Mountains of Switzerland
Mountains of Italy
Italy–Switzerland border
International mountains of Europe
Mountains of Graubünden
Bregaglia